This article presents detailed opinion polling for the 2008 Hong Kong legislative election.

Graphical representation

Overall poll results
Overall poll results each party in geographical constituencies according to each constituency.

See also
 Opinion polling for the Hong Kong legislative election, 2004
 Opinion polling for the Hong Kong legislative election, 2012

References
Public Opinion Programme The University of Hong Kong

Legislative
Hong Kong